Si Racha is a town in Chonburi Province, Thailand.

Si Racha, Sri Racha or Sriracha may refer to:

Si Racha District, the district surrounding the town of Si Racha, Thailand
Sriracha (song), a rap song by Tech N9ne, featuring Logic and Joyner Lucas
Sriracha F.C., a football club based in Si Racha, Thailand
Sriracha, a sauce named after the town, which has become a genericized term for several chili sauces
Sriracha sauce (Huy Fong Foods), a specific variety of Sriracha sauce by Huy Fong Foods
Sriracha (film), a documentary about Huy Fong Foods' Sriracha sauch

See also
3Racha, a trio sub-unit of South Korean boy group Stray Kids